Rock N Roll Hi Fives are an American rock band from New Jersey.

History 
Rock N Roll Hi Fives are a rock and roll four-piece from New Jersey, that formed in 2013. The band is composed of vocalist Eilee Centeno, drummer Evren Centeno, bassist Gloree Centeno, and guitarist and vocalist Joe Centeno. J. Centeno performed in the late 1990s band Plug Spark Sanjay and the post-millennial band American Watercolor Movement. Ei. Centeno and G. Centeno began playing music around 2010, and Ev. Centeno in 2012. The band cites musical influence from AC/DC, Nirvana, Teenage Fanclub, Pavement and early Rolling Stones, as well as '90s indie rock. Rock N Roll Hi Fives' debut EP, Make it Happen, was released on December 15, 2014. On the six-track release, Tris McCall writes "like the Smoosh sisters or Kelly Mayo of Skating Polly, the Centenos are kids who derive their punk authenticity from their early adoption of an aesthetic associated with much older musicians." Rock N Roll Hi Fives' second EP, Gold Glitter Shoes, was released on June 16, 2015. Star-News describes the record as "dipp[ing] its finger in glam rock and a little pop-punk, all led by Eilee's sugar-and-snarl vocals." They made their first tour of the United States in 2015. Rock N Roll Hi Fives performed at the North Jersey Indie Rock Festival on September 23, 2017.

After signing with Little Dickman Records, Rock N Roll Hi Fives released their third EP The Beat the Sound the Dragon's Roar with them, on October 21, 2017. In 2018, Rock N Roll Hi Fives went on a six-show tour of Japan, and published a tour journal in Jersey Beat. Re-introducing the RocknRoll Hi-Fives, their ten-track debut album, released on June 29, 2018.

Members 
Eilee Centeno – vocals and theremin
Evren Centeno – drums
Gloree Centeno –  bass
Joe Centeno – guitars and backing vocals

Discography 
Albums
Re-introducing the RocknRoll Hi-Fives (2018)

EPs
Make it Happen (2014)
Gold Glitter Shoes (2015)
The Beat the Sound the Dragon's Roar (2016)

References 
Citations

Bibliography

External links 

Family musical groups
Little Dickman Records artists
Musical groups established in 2013
Musical groups from New Jersey
2013 establishments in New Jersey